Rishi Sunak's tenure as prime minister of the United Kingdom began on 25 October 2022 when he accepted an invitation from King Charles III to form a government, succeeding Liz Truss. He is the first British Asian and Hindu to hold the office of prime minister. Sunak assumed office amid the Russian invasion of Ukraine and amid the cost of living crisis, which began during his tenure as chancellor of the Exchequer under Prime Minister Boris Johnson. As prime minister, Sunak is also serving as First Lord of the Treasury, Minister for the Civil Service, and Minister for the Union.

Truss defeated Sunak in the July-September 2022 Conservative Party leadership election. Following her resignation amid a government crisis, Sunak was elected unopposed to succeed her after being the sole nominee in the October 2022 party leadership election. He was elected leader of the Conservative Party on 24 October and was appointed prime minister the following day. He has authorised foreign aid and weapons shipments to Ukraine in response to the Russian invasion of the country. In February 2023, Sunak negotiated a proposed agreement with the European Union on Northern Ireland's trading arrangements which was published as the "Windsor Framework".

Shortly  after the start of his premiership, Sunak was criticised for appointing Gavin Williamson and Dominic Raab to the cabinet after both men were accused of bullying, though both deny the claims. Williamson resigned from the cabinet and Raab is subject to an independent investigation after further complaints were made regarding his behaviour. Sunak was also criticised for reappointing Suella Braverman as Home Secretary after she resigned from the position on 19 October and after she admitted two breaches of the ministerial code through sending confidential material by a private email account.   

In January 2023, Sunak dismissed Nadhim Zahawi as Chairman of the Conservative Party after an investigation by Laurie Magnus found he had made a “serious breach” of the Ministerial Code. He appointed Greg Hands to succeed Zahawi in February 2023 during a cabinet reshuffle.

Conservative leadership bids

July–September 2022 
Sunak stood in the July–September 2022 Conservative Party leadership election to replace Boris Johnson, after his resignation amid a government crisis. Announcing his decision to stand in a social media video, Sunak said he wanted to "restore trust, rebuild the economy and reunite the country", and said that his values are "patriotism, fairness, and hard work." His pledges during the campaign included tax cuts only when inflation was under control, scrapping of the 5% VAT rate on household energy for one year, introducing a temporary £10 fine for patients who fail to attend GP appointments, capping of refugee numbers, and a tightening of the definition of asylum.
Sunak and Foreign Secretary Liz Truss emerged as the final two candidates in the contest on 20 July to be put forward to the membership for the final leadership vote; he had received the most votes in each of the series of MP votes with Sunak receiving 137 to Truss's 113 in the final round. In the membership vote, Truss received 57.4% of the vote, making her the new leader over Sunak.

October 2022 
Following the resignation of Truss after another government crisis, Sunak stood in the October 2022 Conservative Party leadership election and formally launched his bid to become Leader of the Conservative Party on 23 October 2022. Sunak was backed by several cabinet members and prominent party members, such as Lord Frost, Kemi Badenoch, Nadhim Zahawi, Matt Hancock, Sajid Javid, Jeremy Hunt, Tom Tugendhat, and Dominic Raab.

There were two other candidates actively seeking nominations: Boris Johnson and Penny Mordaunt. However, Johnson announced that evening that he would not declare his candidacy and Mordaunt withdrew hers on 24 October. It was subsequently announced by Sir Graham Brady of the 1922 Committee that as the sole candidate who had received the required 100 nominations, Sunak had been elected as the new party leader.

Premiership 
Sunak was appointed Prime Minister of the United Kingdom by King Charles III on 25 October 2022, making him the first British Asian prime minister and the first Hindu to hold the office. In his first speech as prime minister, Sunak promised “integrity, professionalism and accountability,” and said that "we will create a future worthy of the sacrifices so many have made and fill tomorrow, and everyday thereafter with hope." Of his predecessor, Sunak said that Truss "was not wrong" to want to improve growth, but admitted that "some mistakes were made", and that he was elected prime minister in part to fix them. He promised to "place economic stability and confidence at the heart of this government's agenda".

Political positions 

Sunak is widely regarded as a pro business moderate and on the centre-ground of the Conservative Party. Unlike his predecessor Liz Truss, Sunak is considered less libertarian.

2022 
On 26 October, Sunak answered his first Prime Minister's Questions (PMQs). The same day Sunak also held his first cabinet meeting.

On 27 October, Sunak announced he would not attend the COP27 climate summit in Egypt "due to other pressing domestic commitments". On 2 November 2022, following pressure from MPs, environmentalist campaigners and others, Sunak announced that he would attend. Sunak attended a reception held by King Charles at Buckingham Palace on 4 November. Sunak told the meeting of approximately 200 politicians and campaigners that the UK will continue with its environmental aims after the end of its COP 26 presidency. In his speech Sunak warned that as climate change ravages the planet there will be more human suffering and that because of inaction, people risk giving their children a desperate inheritance. Sunak also paid tribute to King Charles's longstanding work for the environment.

On 7 November at the COP 27 summit, Sunak launched The Forest and Climate Leaders' Partnership (FCLP), building on a policy called the Glasgow Climate Pact, originally started at COP 26. The partnership aims to halt and reverse deforestation by 2030, bringing 26 countries and the European Union together. These countries account for 60% of global GDP and over 33% of the world's forests and together with private funding, the partnership has total funds of $23.8bn. Sunak said in his speech to the Forest and Climate Leaders' Summit that the world's forests have been undervalued and underestimated, yet were one of the natural wonders of the world. He then asked attendees to build upon what had already been achieved to secure an incredible legacy for generations to come. The FCLP will hold annual meetings and starting in 2023, it will publish an annual Global Progress Report that includes independent assessments.

Following the 15 November missile explosion in Poland, Sunak met U.S. President Joe Biden and delivered a speech. Sunak later met Ukrainian President Volodymyr Zelenskyy, and pledged to give Ukraine £50 million in aid. After meeting Zelenskyy, Sunak said: "I am proud of how the UK stood with Ukraine from the very beginning. And I am here today to say the UK and our allies will continue to stand with Ukraine, as it fights to end this barbarous war and deliver a just peace." In November 2022 the Bank of England feared the UK would experience prolonged recession and feared unemployment would probably double to 6.5%.

The first by-election of Sunak's premiership, took place on 1 December, in the City of Chester constituency and it resulted in a 12% swing from the Conservatives. Also in December, Sunak was faced with the need to make concessions on a proposed ban on onshore wind farms to be contained in the government's Levelling Up and Regeneration Bill. A number Conservative MPs, including Johnson and Truss, said they would back a rebel amendment to the bill that would remove the ban. At the same time, there was the threat of another rebellion and need to make concessions related to housebuilding targets. Many Conservative MP's do not intend to contest the next general election; Sajid Javid, Matt Hancock, and several other Conservative MP's plan to stand down at the next general election.

In December 2022, Sunak said it was "completely unacceptable" that ordinary people were having their lives disrupted by environmental protests. He stated that police commanders had his full support "to suppress any unlawful protest". He also promised to bring in new laws to tackle illegal immigration, saying anyone who comes to the UK illegally will not be allowed to stay. The Independent published an opinion poll that month which suggested that Sunak could lose his seat if polling results found then were duplicated in a general election.

2023 
In January 2023, Sunak confirmed that the deadline for removal of EU legislation from the UK statute book would remain the end of that year, saying that it should be a "collective effort". In February of that year, Sunak negotiated a proposed agreement with the EU on Northern Ireland's trading arrangements which was published as the "Windsor Framework". On 27 February, Sunak delivered a statement to the House of Commons, saying that the proposed agreement "protects Northern Ireland’s place in our Union.

Illegal Migration Bill 

After 45,000 people had crossed the Channel on small boats in the previous year, Sunak announced that stopping these boats would be one of his five priorities for 2023. The Illegal Migration Bill was introduced in March 2023, proposing that people arriving via unofficial routes would be refused asylum and would be detained for at least 28 days before being removed to another safe country. The Home Secretary would have a duty to remove the migrants who arrive without prior permission. The bill also proposes that these migrants would not be able to use modern slavery laws to hallenge government decisions to remove them.

Home Secretary Suella Braverman said the bill may be not be compatible with the European Convention on Human Rights. Questions also arose on the feasibility of the policy such as if there was adequate capacity to hold the people for 28 days or if there were enough agreements with safe countries already in place. The United Nations High Commissioner for Refugees said that it was "profoundly concerned" by the bill, warning that the bill amounted to an asylum ban for those who arrive irregularly.

Ministry 

Sunak began appointing his cabinet on 25 October 2022. Jeremy Hunt remained as chancellor, a role he was given during the Truss ministry after Kwasi Kwarteng was dismissed on 14 October. Dominic Raab was also re-appointed as Deputy Prime Minister and Justice Secretary, both roles he was given during the premiership of Boris Johnson. James Cleverly remained as Foreign Secretary with Suella Braverman returning as Secretary of State for the Home Department, a role from which she had previously resigned during the Truss ministry. Ben Wallace remained as Secretary of State for Defence, a role he had held throughout the Johnson and Truss ministries. Michael Gove returned as Levelling Up Secretary, a role he was dismissed from by Johnson, and Grant Shapps was demoted from Home Secretary to Secretary of State for Business, Energy and Industrial Strategy. Penny Mordaunt remained as Leader of the House of Commons and Lord President of the Council, roles which she had held during the Truss ministry.

Other key appointments include Simon Hart as Parliamentary Secretary to the Treasury and Chief Whip of the House of Commons, Nadhim Zahawi as Party Chairman, Oliver Dowden as Chancellor of the Duchy of Lancaster, Thérèse Coffey as Environment Secretary, Mel Stride as Work and Pensions Secretary and Mark Harper as Transport Secretary.

2023 reshuffle 

The reshuffle saw a significant restructuring of government departments.  New departments included those for Business and Trade, Energy Security and Net Zero, andScience, Innovation and Technology. The Department for International Trade and the Department for Business, Energy and Industrial Strategy were split and merged into other departments.

Ministers who joined the cabinet included Greg Hands took over as Chairman of the Conservative Party from Nadhim Zahawi and Lucy Frazer became Secretary of State for Culture, Media and Sport taking over from Michelle Donelan. Rachel Maclean left the backbenches and joined the Department for Levelling Up, Housing and Communities.

Controversies

Initial appointments 

Sunak was criticised for the appointments of Gavin Williamson and Dominic Raab to the cabinet. Both were accused of bullying, a charge they both denied. Williamson resigned after allegations that he used improper language to former Chief Whip Wendy Morton and had bullied several staffers during his time as a Cabinet minister under Theresa May. Raab faces an independent investigation into complaints arising from his prior tenures as Lord Chancellor and Foreign Secretary under Boris Johnson, and currently faces over 8 alleged cases of bullying. Sunak was also criticised for returning Braverman to the cabinet, despite her previously resigning  due to an alleged security breach when Braverman shared secure information with a colleague. The Public Administration and Constitutional Affairs Select Committee was strongly critical of Braverman's reappointment. The committee stated "To allow this [reappointment] (...) does not inspire confidence in the integrity of government nor offer much incentive to proper conduct in future." Sunak said that his appointments to the government "reflects a unified party and a cabinet with significant experience."

Nadhim Zahawi 

On 29 January 2023, Sunak dismissed Nadhim Zahawi, the Conservative Party chairman, after an inquiry by the Independent Adviser on Ministers' Interests. Sir Laurie Magnus found that Zahawi's actions in relation to his tax affairs were a "serious breach" of the ministerial code. Some unnamed Conservative MPs questioned Sunak's judgement for reappointing Zahawi to his cabinet and his failure to sack him immediately when the tax avoidance allegations first emerged in the media. Michael Portillo approved of Sunak using the proper process but felt the issue had gone on too long. Craig Oliver stated, "Rishi Sunak knew nothing this morning that he didn't know a week ago – he will be lamenting feeling unable to stand up to some backbenchers." Michael Gove supported Sunak. Sunak also faces scrutiny from unnamed sources about how much he knew over Zahawi's tax affairs and when. Unnamed critics of Sunak stated he had not been sufficiently curious about Mr Zahawi's problems, due to what was publicly known or discussed by the press.

Dominic Raab 

The Cabinet Office told officials at No 10 there were informal complaints about Dominic Raab's behaviour before Sunak made him deputy prime minister according to The Times. In 2023, Raab faced an independent investigation into complaints arising from his prior tenures as Lord Chancellor and Foreign Secretary under Boris Johnson while eight complaints were being formally investigated over his alleged bullying. Sunak stated he did not know about formal complaints but his press secretarydid not confirm or deny whether Sunak knew of informal complaints.  Jake Berry maintained there are 24 allegations against Raab and in any other workplace Raab would be suspended during the invetigation.  Sunak has not suspended Raab.  Sunak’s November 2022 interview when he repeatedly refused to mention whether he had been given informal warnings about Raab before getting him into the cabinet concerned critics. Dave Penman of the FDA wrote to Sunak urging Laurie Magnus to examine findings about Raab.

On 14 December 2022, eight complaints were being formally investigated over Dominic Raab's alleged bullying. Labour's Angela Rayner stated she believes Sunak was weak and though Sunak knew Raab's reputation, he chose Raab as deputy Prime Minister. Liberal Democrat Daisy Cooper stated allegations against Raab had increased and his position was getting increasingly untenable. Cooper wanted Sunak to make Raab step down during the investigation and promise Raab "won't be reappointed if they are upheld."

Seatbelt incident 
In January 2023, Sunak was issued a fixed penalty notice by Lancashire Constabulary after a social media video of him failing to wear a seat belt in a moving vehicle was published. Downing Street said Sunak made a "brief error of judgment". It was the second time Sunak got a fixed penalty notice while in government. In April 2022, he received one in relation to Partygate.

International prime ministerial trips 

Sunak has made five international trips to six countries during his premiership.

Notes

References

Rishi Sunak
History of the Conservative Party (UK)
2022 in the United Kingdom
2020s in British politics
Contemporary British history
Sunak, Rishi
British Indian history